Beit Jala Governmental Hospital or Al-Hussein Governmental Hospital is a government hospital in the Beit Jala city, West Bank, Palestine. Followed by the Palestinian Ministry of Health. It was built in 1955 and has 131 beds. It employs 363 staff, including a doctor, nurse, pharmacist, physiotherapist, laboratory technician, radiologist and others.

References 

1955 establishments in the West Bank Governorate
Hospitals established in 1955
Hospitals in Beit Jala